is the eleventh single by the Japanese rock band Nico Touches the Walls, released on December 19, 2012. The song was used as the December opening for the TV program CDTV. It was said by Mitsumura that he composed the song during a dream.

Track listing
Yume 1-gou (夢1号; No. 1 Dream)
Kessen wa Kinyōbi
Fuujin "Live from ALGORHYTMIQUE" (風人) (Bonus Track)
Bicycle "Live from ALGORHYTMIQUE" (バイシクル) (Bonus Track)
Me "Live from ALGORHYTMIQUE" (芽) (Bonus Track)

Chart Position
The single reached number 14 on the Oricon Chart and charted for 3 weeks.

External links
 Nico Touches the Walls official website

2012 singles
Nico Touches the Walls songs
2012 songs
Ki/oon Music singles
Song articles with missing songwriters